"Craving You" is a song recorded by American country music singer Thomas Rhett featuring Maren Morris. It was released to country radio on April 3, 2017 via Valory Music Group as the lead single from Rhett's third studio album, Life Changes, which was released on September 8, 2017. The song was written by Dave Barnes and Julian Bunetta. The song is notable for its cinematic music video.

Background
Rhett was originally scheduled to co-write the song with David Barnes and Julian Bunetta, however, he was sick on the day and was therefore absent at the writing session. Bunetta then send Rhett the demo the next day and Rhett said he was "blown away by the longing-ness of the story". Maren Morris contributed vocals on the song and recorded her parts in an hour. However, it was not decided whether her vocals would be used until later as Rhett thought the song may not be "really a duet song". His producer then sent him a version with just his vocal, and then another version with Morris on it; Rhett said: "I think me and my wife and my team were just collectively like "Wow, she adds such a crazy element to the song.""

Composition
The song was written in the key of A minor, with Rhett's and Morris's vocals spanning from C3 to E5. Apart from pop music, the song also contains elements of country and R&B.

Commercial performance
"Craving You" reached No. 1 on the Country Airplay chart dated July 22, 2017, which is Rhett's eighth No. 1 on that chart and Morris's first No. 1. The song was certified Platinum by the RIAA on December 14, 2017, and it has sold 384,000 copies in the United States as of October 2017.

Music video
The official music video was directed by TK McKamy, and premiered on GQ on March 31, 2017. It is presented as a movie trailer for a crime thriller involving a bank heist, with Morris playing a bank robber and Rhett playing an undercover cop.

Charts

Year-end charts

Certifications

References 

2017 songs
2017 singles
Thomas Rhett songs
Maren Morris songs
Big Machine Records singles
Male–female vocal duets
Songs written by Julian Bunetta
Songs written by Dave Barnes
Song recordings produced by Dann Huff
Song recordings produced by Julian Bunetta